Kunstmuseum St. Gallen (English: Art Museum St. Gallen), is a Swiss art museum founded in 1877 and located in St. Gallen, Switzerland. It is an important museum within Eastern Switzerland because of their expansive European art collection.

About 

The St. Gallen Kunstverein (English: St. Gallen Art Association) helped found the museum. Since 2012, the museum is operated by Stiftung Kunstmuseum St. Gallen (English: The Kunstmuseum St. Gallen Foundation). The building for the museum was designed by architect .

The museum art collection includes Swiss, Dutch, French, and other European-originating paintings and sculptures, ranging in time from the late-Middle Ages to the present-day. Since 1989/1990, the Kunstmuseum St. Gallen has participated in the Manor Cultural Prize, which is awarded every two years for Swiss emerging artist representing the Canton of St. Gallen.

References

External links 

 Official website

Art museums and galleries in Switzerland
Tourist attractions in St. Gallen (city)
Buildings and structures in St. Gallen (city)
1877 establishments in Switzerland